CIIS may refer to:

 California Institute of Integral Studies in San Francisco, United States
 China Institute of International Studies in Beijing, China
 College of Innovation and Industry Skills in Perth, Australia
 Continental Institute of International Studies in India